The first election to the Llandeilo Rural District Council was held in December 1894.  It was followed by the 1898 election. The successful candidates were also elected to the Llandeilo Board of Guardians.

Ward Results

Brechfa (one seat)

Glynamman (two seats)

Llandebie (four seats)

Llandeilo Fawr North Ward (three seats)

Llandeilo Fawr South Ward (two seats)

Llandyfeisant (one seat)

Llanegwad (three seats)

Llanfihangel Aberbythych (two seats)

Llanfihangel Cilfragen (one seat)

Llanfynydd (one seat)

Llangathen (two seats)

Llansawel (two seats)

Quarter Bach (one seat)

Talley (two seats)

References

1894 Welsh local elections
December 1894 events
Elections in Carmarthenshire
19th century in Carmarthenshire